Semagystia tsimgana is a moth in the family Cossidae. It was described by Zukowsky in 1936. It is found in Uzbekistan and the western Tian-Shan.

References

Natural History Museum Lepidoptera generic names catalog

Cossinae
Moths described in 1936